Paraíso is a station on Line 1 (Blue) and Line 2 (Green) of the São Paulo Metro.

Station layout

SPTrans Lines
The following SPTrans bus lines can be accessed. Passengers may use a Bilhete Único card for transfer:

References

São Paulo Metro stations
Railway stations opened in 1975
1975 establishments in Brazil
Railway stations opened in 1991
1991 establishments in Brazil
Railway stations located underground in Brazil